Zadornov is a Russian masculine surname, its feminine counterpart is Zadornova. It may refer to

Mikhail Mikhailovich Zadornov (born 1963), Russian politician and former finance minister.
Mikhail Nikolayevich Zadornov (1948–2017), Russian stand-up comedian and writer
5043 Zadornov, a minor planet named after M.N. Zadornov
Nikolay Pavlovich Zadornov (1909–1992), Russian writer, father of M.N. Zadornov

Russian-language surnames